This is the songs discography for American rapper 50 Cent.

Singles

As lead artist

As featured artist

Other charted songs

Guest appearances

See also 
 50 Cent albums discography
 G-Unit discography

Notes

References

External links 
 
 50 Cent at AllMusic
 
 

Hip hop discographies
Discographies of American artists